Madhura Datar is an Indian singer in Bollywood, and in Marathi. She is known for singing songs of Asha Bhosle.

Early life and education
Datar hails from a musical family from the city of Pune in India. She attended Renuka Swaroop Memorial Girls High School, Pune as a child. Later she attended Pune University affiliated Sir Parashurambhau College from where she obtained her bachelor's degree. Datar was disciple of Shaila Datar and Hridaynath Mangeshkar for her musical training
She has sung in many Marathi movies.

Career
Datar has performed in TV programs like Saregama. She is also a part of the musical program by Hridaynath Mangeshkar named Bhavsargam. Her programs named Diwali Pahat are often performed during Diwali mornings.

She also does her independent program named Swarmadhura. She had also got appreciation from P L Deshpande for her singing.

Films as playback singer 
 Rama Madhav (2014)
 Baburao cha Pakda (2012)
 Parambi (2011)
 Dhyanimani (2017)
Source:

Notable songs
 Ashi Kashi Vedi Maya Lyrics - Dhyanimani 
 Lut Liyo Mohe Sham Savre - Rama Madhav

Awards
 Shahu Modak award for newcomer
 Ram Kadam smruti puraksar
 Zee awards

References

Living people
Indian women playback singers
Tamil-language singers
Marathi-language singers
Singers from Pune
Date of birth missing (living people)
Women musicians from Maharashtra
21st-century Indian singers
21st-century Indian women singers
Year of birth missing (living people)